Tynan and Caledon railway station was on the Ulster Railway in Northern Ireland.

The Ulster Railway opened the station on 25 May 1858 as Tynan, Caledon & Middletown.

On 1 January 1880 it was renamed Tynan & Caledon.

It closed on 14 October 1957.

Routes

References

Disused railway stations in County Armagh
Railway stations opened in 1858
Railway stations closed in 1957
Railway stations in Northern Ireland opened in the 19th century